Cypherotylus is a genus of pleasing fungus beetles in the family Erotylidae. There are over 30 described species in Cypherotylus. It frequently appears in the literature under the name "Gibbifer", but this name is permanently unavailable under ICZN Article 11.4, as are all of Voet's names.

Species
 Cypherotylus aeneoniger Crotch, 1876
 Cypherotylus alutaceus (Gorham, 1888)
 Cypherotylus annulatus (Lacordaire, 1842)
 Cypherotylus annulipes (Guérin-Méneville, 1841)
 Cypherotylus anthracinus (Gorham, 1888)
 Cypherotylus apiatus (Lacordaire, 1842)
 Cypherotylus apicalis Crotch, 1876
 Cypherotylus armillatus (Erichson, 1847)
 Cypherotylus ater (Kirsch, 1876)
 Cypherotylus badeni (Dohrn, 1883)
 Cypherotylus boisduvalii (Chevrolat, 1834)
 Cypherotylus californicus (Lacordaire, 1842) (blue fungus beetle)
 Cypherotylus camelus (Guérin-Méneville, 1841)
 Cypherotylus debauvei (Demay, 1838)
 Cypherotylus dromedarius (Lacordaire, 1842)
 Cypherotylus elevatus (Fabricius, 1801)
 Cypherotylus fenestratus (Gorham, 1888)
 Cypherotylus gaumeri (Gorham, 1888)
 Cypherotylus gibbosus (Linnaeus, 1763)
 Cypherotylus goryi (Guérin-Méneville, 1841)
 Cypherotylus gracilis (Kuhnt, 1908)
 Cypherotylus guatemalae Crotch, 1876
 Cypherotylus impressopunctatus Crotch, 1873
 Cypherotylus impunctatus Crotch, 1876
 Cypherotylus irroratus (Kuhnt, 1908)
 Cypherotylus jacquieri (Lacordaire, 1842)
 Cypherotylus jansoni Crotch, 1873
 Cypherotylus maximus Crotch, 1876
 Cypherotylus miliaris (Lacordaire, 1842)
 Cypherotylus patellatus (Gorham, 1888)
 Cypherotylus sphacelatus (Fabricius, 1801)
 Cypherotylus sticticus (Erichson, 1847)
 Cypherotylus stillatus (Kirsch, 1865)
 Cypherotylus variolosus Crotch, 1876
 Cypherotylus vicinus (Guérin-Méneville, 1841)
 Cypherotylus zebu (Kirsch, 1876)

References

Further reading

External links

 

Erotylidae
Articles created by Qbugbot